Dexamethasone isonicotinate is an anti-inflammatory, anti-allergic glucocorticoid that can be administered orally, by inhalation, locally, and parenterally. It may cause salt and water retention.

References

Corticosteroid esters
Fluorinated corticosteroids
Isonicotinate esters